JS Suō is a Hiuchi-class Auxiliary Multi-purpose Support (AMS) ship of the Japan Maritime Self-Defense Force (JMSDF).<ref>Werth, Eric. (2007). {{Google books|TJunjRvplU4C|Naval Institute Guide to Combat Fleets of the World, p. 392.|page=392}}</ref>

The ship was built by Universal in Keihin and commissioned into service on 16 March 2004.

The primary mission of the Suō is to support training exercises of other ships, including shooting practice and torpedo launching practice.

Service
This ship was one of several in the JMSDF fleet participating in disaster relief after the 2011 Tohoku earthquake and tsunami.

Notes

References
 Wertheim, Eric. (2007). Naval Institute Guide to Combat Fleets of the World: Their Ships, Aircraft, and Systems.''  Annapolis: Naval Institute Press. ;

External links
 JMSDF,  AMS-4302 すおう Suō

Hiuchi-class support ships
2003 ships